Pondok Pak Cus is a situation comedy soap opera that premiered on 14 December 2015 on Trans TV Indonesia .

Cast 
 Mathias Muchus as Mr. Cus
 Selena Alesandra as Citra
 Ariel Tatum as Cecile
 Stefhanie Zamora Husen  as Caca
 Michelle Arthamevia as Shafa
 Sonny Septian as Roy
 Gandhi Fernando as Gandhi
 Riza Shahab as Adi
 Amel Carla as Mili
 Esa Sigit as Ivan
 Meisya Siregar as Tante Mona
 Faby Marcelia as Prilly
 Nabila Putri as Andin
 Ayu Dyah Pasha as Sarah
Natalie Sarah as Bu Tami
TJ as Bu Linda
 Veronica Felicia Kumala as Cici Panda
 Thessa Kaunang as Tessa
 Indra Bekti as Indra

List of episodes 
 Again image Sensi
 Acting Cecyl
 Caca Missing
 Go Daddy, dijadiin House Party Sites
 Kids Courier From Aunt Dona
 Teachers Caca Ganteng
 Already Crushed Ladder Fall
 Sultry room, All So Restless
 Maid Super Hygiene
 From Robot Turun Ke Hati
 Caca task Rezeki Imagery
 Former Former Cecil

References 

Indonesian television series
Indonesian television soap operas